Michalis Stafylas ( 1920 - 22 May 2018) was born in Granitsa, Evrytania in Greece.  He has published biographical and critical work about 50 modern Greek writers, essays, novels, anthologies of stories, poetry anthologies and a theatrical play.  His work has been translated into many languages.

References

External links
 Granitsa Evrytanias

1920 births
2018 deaths
People from Evrytania
Greek writers